Goodbye Pork Pie is a 1981 New Zealand comedy film directed by Geoff Murphy, co-produced by Murphy and Nigel Hutchinson, and written by Geoff Murphy and Ian Mune. The film was New Zealand's first large-scale local hit. One book described it as Easy Rider meets the Keystone Cops.

It was filmed during November 1979, using only 24 cast and crew. Its overheads were surprisingly minimal, to the point that the police cars used doubled as crew and towing vehicles, and that the director Geoff Murphy performed some of the stunts himself.

Plot
In the Northland town of Kaitaia in spring 1978, nineteen-year-old Gerry Austin (Kelly Johnson) opportunistically steals a wallet and uses the cash and driver's licence inside to rent a yellow Mini. With no particular aim in mind, he drifts down to Auckland. Meanwhile, in Auckland, the middle-aged John (Tony Barry), has just had Sue, his girlfriend of six years, walk out on him and fly home to Invercargill. After a night on the bottle, John decides to go down to Invercargill.

Searching for transport, John notices Gerry being stopped by a traffic officer for failing to wear a seat belt. John intervenes and manages to get the officer off writing a ticket. As thanks, Gerry offers John a lift part of the way. The duo stop for petrol in the northern Waikato, but accidentally drive off without paying, drawing police attention to the car.

Further down the road, Gerry and John pick up Shirl (Claire Oberman), who is heading to Wanganui, and after informing the duo that she is a virgin, Gerry makes a bet that this will change before reaching Wanganui. After failing to pay for petrol on purpose in the central North Island, they are pursued by a motorcycle officer, with the duo ending up avoiding arrest by driving into a car wreckers.

Shirl doesn't leave at Wanganui, and decides to stay with the guys and go to Wellington. In Wellington, the trio meet Mulvaney (Bruno Lawrence), an old associate of John's, who gives the trio overnight accommodation at his garage and supplies them with money and drugs in return for parts of the car. Leaving for the inter-island ferry the next morning, Gerry runs a red light and is immediately pursued by the police through central Wellington. The trio avoid the police by driving through the Wellington railway station and stowing the Mini in an empty boxcar being shunted onto the ferry.

Arriving in Picton in the South Island, the boxcar is attached to a train destined for Christchurch, and the trio enjoy a leisurely ride, decorating the wagon with the name "Blondini" and other items found in the train's wagons. After a night of partying, Gerry finally wins his bet with Shirl. Arriving in Christchurch in the morning, the trio finds out the wagon is not leaving the city for the West Coast until that night, so spend the day on the town. Gerry and John return to the train, but notices Shirl is not there, and the train leaves without her.

After leaving the train, Gerry and John stop at a tearoom further down the coast. They find out from the television that Shirl was arrested for shoplifting, and that they're wanted in a national man-hunt of the "Blondini Gang". Crossing back over the Southern Alps, the Mini is pursued by a determined police officer (Marshall Napier) down the Lake Hāwea shoreline. He almost catches Gerry and John, but ends up driving off the road and down the bank trying to avoid a combine harvester blocking the road.  The duo sell more parts off the car at Cromwell, but as they are short-changed John takes a full petrol can as extra payment.

At Dunedin, the duo meet Snout, who helps them avoid a police roadblock and buys more parts off the car. However, after he learns they're heading for Invercargill, he tips them off to the police. Stopping for conveniences, John is spotted by police; unable to find Gerry, he drives off in the Mini, not realising Gerry is underneath the car trying to remove the muffler. Gerry is arrested, but manages to escape from the police car and jumps on top of the fleeing Mini. The police try to PIT the Mini, and Gerry falls off and is hit by the pursuing police car. John says goodbye to the injured Gerry, then takes the car and proceeds to Invercargill.

John encounters a roadblock at the entrance to Invercargill and diverts through a cemetery to avoid it, but not before the Armed Offenders Squad shoots a hole in the Cromwell fuel can, spilling the petrol. Approaching Sue's house, the insecure exhaust dragging along the road ignites the fuel, setting it alight. John reunites with Sue, but their reunion is short-lived when the burning Mini draws the attention of emergency services. With police surrounding the house, John finally admits defeat and surrenders.

Cast

Tony Barry as John
Kelly Johnson as Gerry Austin
Claire Oberman as Shirl
Shirley Gruar as Sue
Jackie Lowitt as Leslie Morris
Don Selwyn as the Kaitaia police officer
Shirley Dunn as the car rental agent
Paki Cherrington as the taxi driver
Christine Lloyd as the disco girl
Maggie Maxwell as Sue's sister
John Ferdinand as the bus station attendant
Clyde Scott as the Auckland traffic officer
Phil Gordin as the first service station attendant
Bruno Lawrence as Mulvaney
Adele Chapman as the Wellington party girl
Ian Watkin as the father in the other yellow Mini
Steven Tozer as the West Coast traffic officer
Frances Edmond as Annette
Marshall Napier as the Lake Wanaka/Lake Hāwea police officer
Bill Juliff as the Cromwell car yard man
John Bach as Snout
Liz Simpson as Alice
Alan Wilks as the Southland police sergeant
Paul Watson as the Southland police officer
Timothy Lee as the truck driver
Michael Woolf as the Armed Offenders Squad leader
Andrew Dungan at the young Armed Offenders Squad member
Frank Prythetch as the gang leader

Impact
Though coming after Sleeping Dogs, the release of Goodbye Pork Pie is considered to be the coming-of-age of New Zealand cinema as it showed that New Zealanders could make successful films about New Zealand. It was the first really financially successful New Zealand film of modern times.

Production
Goodbye Pork Pie was filmed chronologically over six weeks in late 1979, following the north to south route taken by the film's protagonists. Filming began in the northern town of Kaitaia and ended in Invercargill, near the bottom of the South Island. Director Geoff Murphy, who co-produced the film with Nigel Hutchinson, had been good friends with star Tony Barry (Smith) as well as Bruno Lawrence before Goodbye Pork Pie. The three had played together in multi-media group Blerta.

Geoff Murphy cameos in the film as a man working at the second petrol station. Co-producer Nigel Hutchinson sells a banana milk shake "with an egg in it" to John a short time before Gerry falls off the car.

New Zealand band Street Talk provided most of the music heard in the film and formed a large part of the soundtrack, but the group had already broken up by the time the movie was released.

Cars
The yellow mini was a 1978 British Leyland Mini 1000, registered IZ6393. However, three 1978 Minis were used during filming. They were sourced from the New Zealand Motor Corporation (assemblers of British Leyland products in NZ). After filming was completed, two of the Minis that were undamaged were returned to The New Zealand Motor Corporation. The third, which had a hole cut in the roof and the front bodywork removed, was used for promotion and is still in New Zealand. Its actual registration is IX2992. A fourth, 1959 Mini was used for the final scene where it was burnt out. The Holden HQ police cars used in the film doubled as towing and support vehicles for the cast and crew. These were the police cars chasing the Mini throughout both the North and South Islands.

Locations
An early scene in the film shows John and his partner in a taxi, after she has left him, crossing the old Mangere Bridge. The new bridge, at the time of the film's production, was on hold for a couple of years in an unfinished state due to prolonged industrial action.

When Gerry and John pick up Shirl, she is standing in front of the now-decommissioned Meremere coal-fired power station.

The first petrol station that fuel was stolen from is located in Pōkeno, and is now a camper van sales yard. The second petrol station the trio stole fuel from is located in National Park, at the intersection of State Highway 4 and State Highway 47.

On a wet and dismal day, Gerry and John drop Shirl off at an address in Wellington. This was in Palliser Rd, Mt Victoria. When the car pulls up, they are in front of a garage with a large number '24' painted on the front. This garage has since been removed.

John introduces Gerry to his friend Mulvaney at a workshop which was at 97 Aro St, Wellington. The building is still there but somewhat modified since the movie was shot.

The Christchurch railway station where the Mini is stowed while in Christchurch was closed in 1993, replaced by a new station built in Addington. This building was used as a movie theatre and Science Alive from 1993, until the building was badly damaged in the 2011 Christchurch earthquake. The building was demolished in 2012.

A later scene in the film shows Blondini and John in Cromwell, Central Otago. The part of Cromwell shown is now underwater, due to the Lake Dunstan hydroelectric project.

The scene at McNab, Southland where Gerry is caught by the police shows a decrepit old toilet block at the side of the road. It was actually a temporary structure built specifically for the film.

Remake

In 2014, a remake of the film was announced, with Matt Murphy – one of Geoff Murphy's sons who had worked on the original version – as director. The same year, a re-enactment of the Lake Hāwea chase was filmed to promote the New Mini, which featured prominently in the remake, simply known as Pork Pie.

Filming of Pork Pie started in March 2016. Dean O'Gorman, James Rolleston and Ashleigh Cummings star as Jon (John), Luke (Gerry) and Kiera (Shirl) respectively. The film's first trailer was released on 17 October 2016, with the film released in cinemas on 2 February 2017. The remake was not as successful as the original.

References

External links

 Goodbye Pork Pie on NZ On Screen
New Zealand film and television in 1981

1980s New Zealand films
New Zealand comedy films
1981 films
Films set in New Zealand
Films directed by Geoff Murphy
Films shot in New Zealand
1980s chase films
Films set in 1978
Auckland in fiction
Christchurch in fiction
Invercargill in fiction
Wellington in fiction
1980s English-language films